There are a number of places called Ceresco in the United States:

Ceresco, Michigan
Ceresco Township, Minnesota
Ceresco, Nebraska
Ceresco, Wisconsin (1844–1858), site of the Wisconsin Phalanx, today part of Ripon, Wisconsin

See also
Cresco (disambiguation)